San Juan Formation may refer to:

 San Juan Formation, Argentina, an Ordovician geologic formation in Argentina
 San Juan Formation, Mexico, an Eocene geologic formation in Mexico
 San Juan Raya Formation, an Albian geologic formation in Mexico
 San Juan Terrace Formation, a Pleistocene geologic formation in Peru